Penile Hill is a summit in Franklin County, Tennessee, in the United States.

References

Landforms of Franklin County, Tennessee
Mountains of Tennessee